Crusaders Rugby may refer to:

 Crusaders Rugby League, a Welsh rugby league club.
 Crusaders (rugby union), a New Zealand rugby union team.
 Harlequins RL, an English rugby league club once known as "London Crusaders".